Richard Brent may refer to:

Richard Brent (politician) (1757–1814), U.S. Congressman and senator from Virginia
Richard P. Brent (born 1946), Australian mathematician and computer science professor

See also
R. Brent Tully (born 1943), Canadian-born American astronomer based in Hawaii